Nauris Petkevičius (born 19 February 2000) is Lithuanian footballer who plays as a attacker for Žalgiris on loan from the Belgian club Charleroi.

Career
In 2017, Petkevičius signed for the reserves of French Ligue 1 side Lille after trialing for the youth academy of Brentford in the English second tier. In 2020, he signed for Lithuanian second tier club Hegelmann, helping them earn promotion to the Lithuanian top flight. Before the second half of 2021–11, he signed for Charleroi in the Belgian top flight. On 22 January 2022, Petkevičius debuted for Charleroi during a 0–0 draw with AA Gent. 

On 3 February 2023, Petkevičius was loaned to Žalgiris.

References

External links
 

2000 births
Sportspeople from Kaunas
Living people
Lithuanian footballers
Lithuania youth international footballers
Lithuania under-21 international footballers
Lithuania international footballers
Association football forwards
FC Stumbras players
Lille OSC players
R. Charleroi S.C. players
K Beerschot VA players
FK Žalgiris players
A Lyga players
Belgian Pro League players
Challenger Pro League players
Expatriate footballers in France
Lithuanian expatriate sportspeople in France
Expatriate footballers in Belgium
Lithuanian expatriate sportspeople in Belgium